Tony Collins may refer to:
 Tony Collins (American football) (born 1959), American football player with the New England Patriots and Miami Dolphins
 Tony Collins (footballer) (1926–2021), English football player, manager and scout
 Tony Collins (historian) (born 1961), British social historian

See also
Toni Collins or Antonietta Collins (born 1991), Mexican-American sportscaster
Anthony Collins (disambiguation)
Antony Collins (disambiguation)